The Whaley Homestead, in Ravalli County, Montana near Stevensville, Montana, was listed on the National Register of Historic Places in 1992.  The listing included four contributing buildings and four contributing sites.

The property was settled by Peter Whaley in 1877. The first building on the site was a log house he built in 1879, which was used for many years as a secondary residence, but burned in 1916. He built the surviving large log-framed house by 1885. It is a two-story log building with pine and some larch weatherboard siding, built upon a rubble stone foundation. Absence of weathering suggests the siding was added soon after original construction.

There are three outbuildings and foundations of four other outbuildings included in the listing.

The property is located on Wildfowl Road west of the East Side Highway in the Lee Metcalf National Wildlife Refuge.

References

National Register of Historic Places in Ravalli County, Montana
Log buildings and structures on the National Register of Historic Places in Montana
Buildings and structures completed in 1885
Farms on the National Register of Historic Places in Montana
1885 establishments in Montana Territory